Bahuara is a Gram Panchayat in Marhaura Tehsil, Chhapra District, Bihar. Its Panchayat office is the Panchayat Bhawan of Bahuara Panchayat; the nearest major town is Chhapra, which lies 15 km away.

Villages 
The following villages are located in this panchayat:
 Bahuara Patti
 Bind Bahuara
 Repura
 Semal Sarai
 Deo Bah

Population  
The following populations were recorded in the 2001 Census:
 Bahuara Patti - 2922
 Bind Bahuara - 1682
 Repura - 1356
 Semal Sarai - 1083
 Deo Bahuara - 1600
 Raj Ganwan - 545

References 

Villages in Saran district
Gram panchayats in Bihar